The Women's Room is a 1980 American made-for-television drama film directed by Glenn Jordan and starring Lee Remick, Ted Danson, Colleen Dewhurst and Tovah Feldshuh. In spite of Esther Shapiro's (ABC's vice president for miniseries) struggle with the (predominantly male) network to release the film despite its feminist content, "The Women's Room finally aired, and it received a huge 45 share (the highest rated movie on TV that week), prompted a raft of positive mail, and won an Emmy".

Premise
A married mother of two leaves her philandering husband and enrolls in graduate school.

Cast
 Lee Remick as Mira Adams
 Colleen Dewhurst as Val
 Patty Duke as Lily
 Kathryn Harrold as Bliss
 Tovah Feldshuh as Iso
 Tyne Daly as Adele
 Lisa Pelikan as Kyla
 Heidi Vaughn as Samantha
 Mare Winningham as Chris
 Ted Danson as Norman
 Gregory Harrison as Ben Volper
 Jenny O'Hara as Mrs. Martinelli
 Christopher Pennock as Harley
 Al Corley as Tad Ford

Critical reception
Critic Tom Shales found the film to be annoying and a "stinker." John J. O'Connor found the film to be a successful adaptation of the book and thoroughly enjoyed the movie, stating that "No one will be bored."

References

External links

American television films
Films based on American novels
1980 television films
1980 films
1980s feminist films
ABC network original films
Films directed by Glenn Jordan
Films scored by Billy Goldenberg
1980s English-language films
Films with screenplays by Carol Sobieski